Tan Sri Datin Paduka Zaharah binti Ibrahim was the eleventh Chief Judge of Malaya. She also served as chairperson of Prasarana Malaysia Berhad (Malaysian Infrastructure Limited).

Education 
She then graduated from University of Malaya in Kuala Lumpur, Malaysia with a Bachelor of Laws (Honours) (LL.B.) in 1977.

Career 
Zaharah Ibrahim began her career in the legal field on 26 April 1977 as a law officer. She was later appointed into the Judicial and Legal Service and held the post of Magistrate at Alor Gajah, Jasin, and Merlimau, all in Malacca.

Between 1981 and 2004 she assumed various positions in the Attorney General's Chambers of Malaysia and the Ministry of Domestic Trade and Consumer Affairs. Her last position in the service was as the Parliamentary Draftsman between 1996 and 2004.

On 1 August 2004, she was appointed as a Judicial Commissioner of the High Court of Malaya and served in the Kuala Lumpur and Shah Alam High Court. On July 28, 2006, she was confirmed as a High Court Judge.

On 14 April 2010, she was elevated as Court of Appeal judge.

On 16 February 2015, she was appointed as Federal Court judge.

On 11 July 2018, she was appointed to the post of Chief Judge of The High Court of Malaya by the Yang di-Pertuan Agong. She replaced Ahmad Maarop who was promoted as President of the Court of Appeal of Malaysia. However, she was only sworn-in at the Palace of Justice when she returned to Malaysia on 17 July 2018, hence becoming only the second woman to assume the third highest judicial office of the country.

On 11 November 2019, she was appointed as chairperson of Prasarana Malaysia Berhad (Malaysian Infrastructure Limited). She succeeds former Inspector-General of Police (IGP), Khalid Abu Bakar, who resigned from office following the defeat of the National Front (BN) in the 14th Malaysian general election. In mid-May 2020, Ibrahim was replaced by Tajuddin Abdul Rahman, United Malays National Organisation's (UMNO's) Member of Parliament (MP) for Pasir Salak, following the 2020 Malaysian constitutional crisis which saw the Alliance of Hope (PH) governing coalition being ousted from power.

Honours 
  :
  Officer of the Order of the Defender of the Realm (KMN) (1992)
  Commander of the Order of Meritorious Service (PJN) - Datuk (2004)
  Commander of the Order of Loyalty to the Crown of Malaysia (PSM) - Tan Sri (2016)
  :
  Companion of the Order of the Crown of Selangor (SMS)
  Knight Commander of the Order of the Crown of Selangor (DPMS) - Datin Paduka (1997)

References 

Living people
1952 births
People from Johor
Malaysian Muslims
Malaysian people of Malay descent
21st-century Malaysian judges
20th-century Malaysian judges
University of Malaya alumni
Officers of the Order of the Defender of the Realm
Commanders of the Order of Meritorious Service
Commanders of the Order of Loyalty to the Crown of Malaysia
Knights Commander of the Order of the Crown of Selangor
Malaysian women lawyers